Colletes elegans a species of ground-nesting bee in the genus Colletes, which is found in Israel. It has been found that the species has a strong preference during pollination to plants in the family Resedaceae.

See also
 List of bees of Israel

References

Colletidae
Hymenoptera of Asia
Insects of the Middle East
Insects described in 1936